The top eighteen teams with the combined scores at the 2009 and 2010 Pan American Championship would qualify athletes, with the teams finishing higher, qualifying more athletes. Mexico as hosts enters a full team for each gender. Each nation may only enter a maximum of two athletes per weight category.

Qualification timeline

Summary

Men 

Dominican Republic declined one quota.
Chile withdrawn due to drug failure

Women 

Aruba had originally qualified a team of one female athlete, however that athlete (Jennifer Pifter) tested positive for drugs and was suspended. The athlete was replaced by an athlete from Honduras.

References

External links
Standings after 2009 Pan American Championship - Men
2009/10 Pan American Championship results
Points system

Qualification for the 2011 Pan American Games
Weightlifting at the 2011 Pan American Games